Clare Griffiths is a British statistician who is head of the UK COVID-19 dashboard at the UK Health Security Agency, previously known as Public Health England. She specialises in mortality statistics. During the COVID-19 pandemic, Griffiths provided the daily COVID statistics for the United Kingdom.

Early life and education 
Griffiths originally studied human sciences at University College London. She moved to the London School of Hygiene & Tropical Medicine as a graduate student, where she completed a masters degree in medical demography.

Career 
In 1998, Griffiths joined the Office for National Statistics as a researcher. She served as Head of Mortality Analysis at the Office for National Statistics from 2004.

Griffiths joined Public Health England at its formation in 2013, leading work on the Public Health Outcomes Framework. She was made Head of the Profession for Statistics in 2019. In the early days of the COVID-19 pandemic, Griffiths was invited to join the COVID-19 dashboard team. She said that even before being asked she had already started wondering how big data could be used to inform public policy. She became responsible for the Government of the United Kingdom's COVID dashboard, which reported data on the daily number of cases, deaths and vaccinations. The data is released daily at 16:00.

In 2021, the I newspaper described Griffiths' dashboard as being more clear and detailed than any other COVID dashboard.

Selected publications

References 

Public Health England
British statisticians
Women statisticians
Living people
Year of birth missing (living people)
Alumni of the London School of Hygiene & Tropical Medicine
21st-century British women scientists